Steven Dixon was an American Negro league pitcher in the 1910s.

Dixon played for the Chicago Giants in 1914 and 1915, and for the Chicago American Giants in 1916. In nine recorded career appearances on the mound, he posted a 3.36 ERA over 67 innings.

References

External links
Baseball statistics and player information from Baseball-Reference Black Baseball Stats and Seamheads

Year of birth missing
Year of death missing
Place of birth missing
Place of death missing
Chicago American Giants players
Chicago Giants players
Baseball pitchers